The Arado E.580 was a German World War II jet fighter design.  Based on a design from 1943, the E.580 was then altered for the Volksjäger competition.

Design
It had a single BMW 003A-1 engine above the fuselage, with the intake partially obstructed by the canopy. It had two MG 151/20 or MK 108 cannons in the nose.

Replica 
An exhibit on display at the Military Aviation Museum in Virginia Beach, Virginia is claimed to be a replica.

References

World War II jet aircraft of Germany